The 2012–13 UNLV Runnin' Rebels men's basketball team represented the University of Nevada, Las Vegas during the 2012–13 NCAA Division I men's basketball season. The team was coached by Dave Rice, in his second year with the Runnin' Rebels. They played their home games at the Thomas & Mack Center on UNLV's main campus in Las Vegas, Nevada and were a member of the Mountain West Conference. They finished with a record of 25–10 overall, 10–6 in Mountain West play to finish in third place. They advanced to the championship game of the Mountain West tournament where they lost to New Mexico. They receive an at-large bid in the 2013 NCAA tournament where they lost in the second round to California.

Roster

Recruiting Class

Rankings

*AP does not release post-NCAA Tournament rankings.

Schedule and results 

|-
!colspan=9| Exhibition

|-
!colspan=9| Regular season

|-
!colspan=9| Mountain West tournament

|-
!colspan=9| NCAA tournament

References 

UNLV
UNLV Runnin' Rebels basketball seasons
UNLV
Run
Run